Jervis Gordon Grist Mill Historic District, also known as Milford Grist Mill and Rowe's Mill, is a historic grist mill and national historic district located at Milford, Pike County, Pennsylvania.  The district includes three contributing buildings and one contributing structure. The buildings are a late-19th century grist mill, blacksmith complex, and millers house. The contributing structure consists of the mill pond, dam, head race, and tail race.

The Jervis Gordon Grist Mill consists of the original two-story structure built in 1882, with a shed addition built in 1904, rear enclosure covering the water wheel, and machine shop addition dated to about 1908.  The mill include original grinding machinery.

The blacksmith complex consists of three sections built between about 1860 and 1870.  The millers house is a wood-frame structure dated to the late-18th century, with a two-story addition built in the early- to mid-19th century.

The buildings were added to the National Register of Historic Places in 1985.

The Jervis Gordon Grist Mill, now known as the Upper Mill, has been restored and is open for self-guided tours.  Admission is free.

References

External links

 The Upper Mill - official site

Grinding mills on the National Register of Historic Places in Pennsylvania
Buildings and structures in Pike County, Pennsylvania
Museums in Pike County, Pennsylvania
Grinding mills in Pennsylvania
Mill museums in Pennsylvania
Historic districts on the National Register of Historic Places in Pennsylvania
National Register of Historic Places in Pike County, Pennsylvania